Edwin Calnick (born 22 November 1937) is a Jamaican cricketer. He played in two first-class matches for the Jamaican cricket team in 1958/59.

See also
 List of Jamaican representative cricketers

References

External links
 

1937 births
Living people
Jamaican cricketers
Jamaica cricketers
Sportspeople from Kingston, Jamaica